The Cyberathlete Professional League (CPL) was a professional sports tournament organization specializing in computer and console video game competitions. It was founded by Angel Munoz on June 27, 1997, in Dallas, Texas.  The CPL is considered the pioneer in professional video game tournaments, which have been held worldwide. The CPL's tournaments are open to all registrants, but due to the ESRB content rating of some video games, CPL competitions are restricted to participants age 17 or older. The CPL has distributed more than US$3 million in cash prizes.

In 2005, the CPL moved to a World Tour format. The 2005 CPL World Tour focused on the one-on-one deathmatch game Painkiller, and had a total prize purse of $1 million. The winner of the CPL Grand Finals event, Johnathan "Fatal1ty" Wendel, went home with the grand prize of $150,000, while Sander "Vo0" Kaasjager took home the MVP trophy for having the most tournament wins.

In March 2008, the CPL ceased operations, citing a "crowded field of competing leagues". On August 25, 2008, the CPL announced that it had signed an acquisition agreement with an investment group based in Abu Dhabi, United Arab Emirates. On August 23, 2010, the former parent company of the CPL, announced that the two-year acquisition process of the CPL was finalized, and that the sole owner of the CPL (and its subsidiaries) was now WoLong Ventures PTE of Singapore. Following this acquisition, the CPL has hosted annual competitions in China, in collaboration with the municipal government of Shenyang.

Events

2007 and 2010s

2006

The 2006 CPL World Season was a series of electronic sports competitions organized by the CPL in the fall of 2006. It was a follow up of the 2005 CPL World Tour and was announced by the CPL on July 31, 2006.

The tour featured two games, Counter-Strike and Quake 3. After a total of 7 qualifier events, the finals were held on 16–20 December 2006 at the Hyatt Regency hotel in Dallas, Texas. The championship finals had a total prize purse of $150,000 and were won by ORG: Team: fnatic (Counter-Strike) and Paul "czm" Nelson (Quake 3).

2005

At the 2004 Cyberathlete Extreme Summer Championships, the CPL announced details on its largest event ever, the CPL World Tour. This event took place throughout 2005, with a total of 10 international stops, and a finals event held in New York City, televised by MTV.

2004

Past CPL World Champions

Individual competitions
 2006 - USA - Paul "czm" Nelson - Quake III
 2005 - USA - Johnathan "Fatal1ty" Wendel - Painkiller
 2004 - The Netherlands - Sander "Vo0" Kaasjager - Painkiller
 2003 - Norway - Chris "kJer" Lujan - Painkiller
 2002 - USA - Johnathan "Fatal1ty" Wendel - Unreal Tournament 2003
 2001 - USA - Johnathan "Fatal1ty" Wendel - Alien versus Predator 2
 2001 - Australia - Harley "HarlsoM" Grey - Quakeworld
 2000 - USA - Johnathan "Fatal1ty" Wendel - Quake III
 1999 - USA - Mark "wombat" Larsen - Quake III
 1998 - USA - Dan "Rix" Hammans - Quake II
 1997 - USA - Tom "gollum" Dawson - Quake

Team competitions
 2007: USA - Pandemic - Counter-Strike Source
 2006: Sweden - fnatic - Counter-Strike
 2005: Sweden - SK Gaming - Counter-Strike
 2004 - Unattached - Team NoA - Counter-Strike
 2003 - Sweden - SK Gaming - Counter-Strike
 2002 - USA - Team3D - Counter-Strike
 2001 - Sweden - Ninjas in Pyjamas - Counter-Strike
 2000 - Sweden - e9 - Counter-Strike

Cyberathlete Amateur League

The CPL also owned and operated an online video game league for amateur players and teams, named the Cyberathlete Amateur League or CAL. CAL operated year-round, with regular eight-week seasons, one or two matches per week, and a single-elimination postseason (playoffs).

On November 14, 2008, the newly formed CPL Holding Group, LLC from United Arab Emirates announced that it had acquired CAL. On February 22, 2009, CAL ceased online operations. At its peak CAL was one of the largest online gaming leagues in North America with 20,000 teams and over 600,000 registered players.

The CAL is based mainly on online game play. A 2003 competition hosted by CAL was played in a Hyatt Regency Ballroom.  Several tables were placed together where 10 computers were set up for the professional gamers.  The game was Half-Life: Counterstrike. The CAL ceased operating in 2009.

CPL divisions
In mid-2006, the CPL together with its international partners announced a series of licensed divisions to bring worldwide the experience of the CPL events.

 Singapore: Edge of Reality
 China: Media Gaming Live Pte Ltd
 Australia: Ping Events Australia EH? (James Duffy's "Puffing Duffy's Pro's")
 Chile: ALM Ingenieria (LAN-Z) S.A.
 Brazil: Made in Brazil Esportes Eletrônicos (MiBR) Ltda
 South Korea: International e-Sports Group, Inc (IEG)
 Sweden: E-Sport Entertainment Group AB (EEG)
 Romania: E-Sport Entertainment, Inc (OSIM)
 Italy: A.S. Play.it (ASPI)

Possible fraud leak
On April 2, 2010, a former CGS employee Tonya Welch, released information about an alleged "fraud scheme" by which the new buyers of the CPL had made fictitious statements to the general public and to the previous owner of the CPL. She claimed that the investors were not from Abu Dhabi, as had been announced, but that the purchase was actually conducted by a private group of US investors. Despite the allegations the acquisition was ultimately completed by WoLong Ventures of Singapore.

References

External links
 

 
Video game organizations
Sports leagues established in 1997
Sports leagues disestablished in 2008
Sports leagues established in 2008
1997 establishments in Texas
Privately held companies of Singapore